We is the nominative case  of the first-person plural pronoun in the English language.

We may also refer to:

Arts and entertainment

Film
 We (1982 film), a German film based on the 1921 novel by Yevgeny Zamyatin
 W.E., a 2011 film directed by Madonna
 We (2018 film), a Belgian–Dutch drama film
 We (2022 film), a Russian film

Television
 We TV, an American pay television channel

Gaming
 Winning Eleven, a soccer video game
 Wood Elves (Warhammer), a fictional race

Literature
 "WE" (1927 book), an autobiography of Charles Lindbergh
 We (novel), a novel by Yevgeny Zamyatin

Music

Performers
 We (band), a Norwegian rock band

Songs
 "We", a song by The Roches from their self-titled album
 "We", a song by Joy Williams from Genesis (Joy Williams album)
 "We", a song by Leo Ieiri from the eponymous album
 "We" (song), a song by South Korean girl group Pledis Girlz

Albums
 We (Leo Ieiri album), a 2016 album by Leo Ieiri
 We (Arcade Fire album), a 2022 album by Arcade Fire
 We (Winner EP), a 2019 EP by Winner
 We (EXID EP), a 2019 EP by EXID
 We, a 2011 album by Van Bod

Businesses
 WE, an Egyptian mobile service brand owned by Telecom Egypt
 WE (clothing), a Dutch clothing brand
 WESC, a Swedish clothing brand often known as "We"
 WeWork (NYSE: WE), an American commercial real estate company
 Wheeling and Lake Erie Railway (1990)
 Centurion Air Cargo (IATA code WE)
 Thai Smile (IATA code WE)

Language
 We (kana), an obsolete Japanese character
 Wè language, a language of Côte d'Ivoire

Other uses
 Wé, a town in the Loyalty Islands Province of New Caledonia
 WE Charity, a youth program
 We, a unit for the electrical Watt
 We (rat snake), an albino two-headed rat snake
 Majestic plural, or the Royal "We"
 World energy, the total worldwide energy available for consumption

See also

 
 
 
 Wee (disambiguation)
 Wei (disambiguation)
 Wie (disambiguation), sometimes pronounced similarly to "we"
 Wii (pronounced "we"), Nintendo's fifth video game console
 Oui (disambiguation), the French word for yes that is pronounced similarly